Nemansky District is an administrative district (raion), one of the fifteen in Kaliningrad Oblast, Russia. As a municipal division, it is incorporated as Nemansky Municipal District. It is located in the north of the oblast. Its administrative center is the town of Neman. Population:  22,536 (2002 Census);  The population of Neman accounts for 58.6% of the district's total population.

Geography
The district borders Lithuania along the Neman River. It surrounds the town of Sovetsk, which is not a part of the district. The railway line from Chernyakhovsk to Sovetsk passes through the district, as well as a cargo line from Sovetsk to Neman, and the main road Kaliningrad–Talpaki–Sovetsk, which carries the major part of traffic to St. Petersburg via Lithuania and Latvia.

Nemansky District is sparsely populated; forests and steppe pasture-land prevail.

References

Notes

Sources

External links
Official website of Nemansky District 
Nemanskiye Vesti newspaper 

Districts of Kaliningrad Oblast